The name Florita has been used for six tropical cyclones in the Philippines by PAGASA in the Western Pacific.

 Typhoon Rammasun (2002) (T0205, 09W, Florita) – struck South Korea.
 Tropical Storm Bilis (2006) (T0604, 05W, Florita) – struck Taiwan and China.
 Severe Tropical Storm Lionrock (2010) (T1006, 07W, Florita) – made landfall on the east coast of Guangdong Province, China.
 Typhoon Neoguri (2014) (T1408, 08W, Florita)
 Typhoon Prapiroon (2018) (T1807, 09W, Florita)
 Tropical Storm Ma-on (2022) (T2209, 10W, Florita) – struck the northern Philippines, South China and northern Vietnam.

Pacific typhoon set index articles